Raj Kumar Rai was a Lok Sabha member from 1984 to 1989 representing Ghosi. He was also a member of the Uttar Pradesh Legislative Assembly from 1980 to 1985, and the Public Accounts Committee from 1983 to 1984.

Biography 
He was born into a Bhumihar family on 1 January 1939, in Surajpur, a village of Mau district, in Uttar Pradesh.

After completing his early education in the village he went to Varansi where he completed an M.A., LL.B from Banaras Hindu University. He was an advocate for the Azamgarh civil court. He first joined congress party and worked as and MLA in UP legislative assembly. In 1984 he was elected a member of parliament (Lok Sabha) for Ghosi, under Prime minister Rajiv Gandhi. After some years he resigned from the membership of Lok Sabha and from the Congress party. He then joined Vishwanath Pratap Singh's Janta Dal and became its national secretary. He contested several Lok Sabha elections and fought for the cause of socialism. After that he came in contact with Samajvadi party supremo  Mulayam Singh Yadav and joined the party. He became the chairman of Uttar Pradesh Beej Pramanikaran Nigam (equivalent to cabinet minister).

He was married to Lalita Devi Rai with whom he had four children (two sons and two daughters). He was jailed twice on the occasion of the arrest of Indira Gandhi in 1977.

Death 
He died on 24 September 2012 aged 73. His last rituals were performed at Muktidham Dohrighat.

1939 births
2012 deaths
Lok Sabha members from Uttar Pradesh
India MPs 1984–1989
People from Mau district
Janata Dal politicians
Indian National Congress politicians
Samajwadi Party politicians
Samajwadi Party politicians from Uttar Pradesh